Charles Williams Jr. (born September 11, 1996) is an American professional basketball player. He played college basketball for the Howard Bison between 2016 and 2020 where he became the Mid-Eastern Athletic Conference's all-time leading scorer. As of 2021–22 he plays for B.B.C. Etzella in Luxembourg.

Early life and high school career
Williams started playing basketball at age four and grew up playing in a local recreational league in Petersburg,  Virginia. He drew inspiration from Kobe Bryant and was nicknamed "Bean" after Bryant's middle name. Williams attended Evangel Christian School in Dale City, Virginia before moving to Millwood School in Midlothian, Virginia for his sophomore season. In his first year, he was a member of Millwood's inaugural varsity basketball team. In the same season, Williams helped his team win the Virginia Independent Schools Athletic Association Division III state championship, scoring 28 points in the title game. As a senior, he was a first-team all-league selection. Williams committed to play college basketball for Howard in part because of his father's relationship with head coach Kevin Nickelberry.

College career
In his freshman season at Howard, Williams was named Mid-Eastern Athletic Conference (MEAC) Rookie of the Week seven times and scored a career-high 37 points in a 73–70 loss to Savannah State on January 28, 2017. He averaged 15.7 points per game and was named MEAC Rookie of the Year and Third Team All-MEAC. As a sophomore, he was joined in Howard's back court by R. J. Cole. Williams averaged 20.4 points per game, which ranked second in the MEAC behind Cole, and became the second fastest player to reach 1,000 career points in program history. He was named to the First Team All-MEAC. In his junior season, he averaged 17.9 points per game, finishing second in the MEAC behind Cole, and earned First Team All-MEAC honors for his second time. He declared for the 2019 NBA draft before deciding to return to Howard. On November 30, 2019, as a senior, he became Howard's all-time leading scorer after posting 13 points in a loss to Mount St. Mary's. Williams scored a season-high 34 points on January 14, 2020 in a 101–95 overtime loss to South Carolina State. On February 22, he became the all-time leading scorer in the MEAC, surpassing Delaware State's Tom Davis, who played from 1987 to 1991. In his senior season, he averaged 18.5 points and 4.3 rebounds per game and was a Second Team All-MEAC selection.

Professional career
After going undrafted in the 2020 NBA draft, Williams eventually signed with B.B.C. Etzella in 2021, a team in Luxembourg's Total League, the highest men's basketball league in that country.

Career statistics

College

|-
| style="text-align:left;"| 2016–17
| style="text-align:left;"| Howard
| 34 || 25 || 30.0 || .396 || .342 || .759 || 2.6 || .6 || .6 || .4 || 15.6
|-
| style="text-align:left;"| 2017–18
| style="text-align:left;"| Howard
| 33 || 33 || 35.5 || .446 || .409 || .782 || 3.4 || .6 || .8 || .3 || 20.4
|-
| style="text-align:left;"| 2018–19
| style="text-align:left;"| Howard
| 33 || 33 || 31.1 || .446 || .373 || .855 || 2.7 || .7 || .7 || .3 || 17.9
|-
| style="text-align:left;"| 2019–20
| style="text-align:left;"| Howard
| 33 || 31 || 34.2 || .414 || .300 || .702 || 4.3 || 1.2 || .7 || .5 || 18.5
|- class="sortbottom"
| style="text-align:center;" colspan="2"| Career
| 133 || 122 || 32.7 || .426 || .357 || .766 || 3.2 || .8 || .7 || .4 || 18.1

Personal life
Williams' father, Charles Sr., played college basketball for Virginia State. In September 2018, his mother, Michelle Watts, was diagnosed with Stage 2 breast cancer, before eventually recovering.

See also
List of NCAA Division I men's basketball career scoring leaders

References

External links
Howard Bison bio
RealGM profile

1996 births
Living people
American expatriate basketball people in Luxembourg
American men's basketball players
Basketball players from Richmond, Virginia
Howard Bison men's basketball players
Shooting guards